Frantz is a masculine given name. Notable people with the name include:

 Frantz Bertin (born 1983), Haitian footballer
 Frantz Bruun (1832-1908), Norwegian priest
 Frantz Casseus (1915-1993), Haitian guitarist
 Frantz Fanon (1925-1961), Martiniquais psychiatrist
 Frantz Funck-Brentano (1862-1947), Luxembourgian French historian
 Frantz Gilles (born 1977), Haitian footballer
 Frantz Granvorka (born 1976), French volleyball player
 Frantz Hardy (born 1985), American footballer
 Frantz Heldenstein (1892-1975), Luxembourgian sculptor
 Frantz Hunt Coe (1856-1904), American physician
 Frantz Joseph (born 1986), American Canadian footballer
 Frantz Kruger (born 1975), South African Finnish discus thrower
 Frantz Lender (1881-1927), Russian weapons designer
 Frantz Mathieu (21st century), Haitian footballer
 Frantz Reichel (1871-1932), French athlete
 Frantz Vitko (21st century), Belarusian trade unionist

Fictional characters 
 Frantz (Coppélia), character in the sentimental comic ballet Coppélia
 Frantz, character in the Japanese anime series Yu-Gi-Oh! GX
 Frantz Fuchs, character in the Hitman series of video games

See also 
 Franz (disambiguation)
 Frantz (disambiguation)

Masculine given names

fr:Frantz